İsmail Budak (born 8 July 1992) is a German footballer who plays as a forward for Preußen Münster II.

References

External links
 Profile on FuPa.net

1992 births
Living people
Sportspeople from Münster
Footballers from North Rhine-Westphalia
Turkish footballers
German footballers
German people of Turkish descent
Association football forwards
VfL Osnabrück players
SC Verl players
3. Liga players
Regionalliga players
FC Eintracht Rheine players